Cape North is a large bluff with much rock exposed along the north and east sides, standing at the west side of Nielsen Fjord on the north coast of Victoria Land. Although it is not the northernmost coastal point in the immediate area, the feature is conspicuous and presumably is the one observed by Captain James Clark Ross in 1841 and given the name Cape North. On the chart by Ross, Cape North is depicted as the northernmost cape observed westward of Cape Hooker.

References
 

Headlands of Victoria Land